"I Get Excited" may refer to:

"I Get Excited", a single from Rick Springfield's 1982 album Success Hasn't Spoiled Me Yet
"I Get Excited (You Get Excited Too)", the b-side to the Pet Shop Boys' 1988 single "Heart"